Joan of Arc Kissing the Sword of Deliverance is a 1863 painting by the English artist Dante Gabriel Rossetti. It was bought for the Strasbourg Museum of Modern and Contemporary Art (MAMCS) at the Piccadilly Gallery in 1996, as the first Rossetti painting ever bought by a French museum. Its inventory number is 55.996.8.1.

The model for the painting has a noticeably big chin and strong neck. She may have been a Mrs. Beyer from Germany, or an acquaintance of Rossetti's named Agnes Manetti. The painting is on permanent loan from the MAMCS to the Musée des Beaux-Arts in Palais Rohan.

References

External links 

Paintings in the collection of the Strasbourg Museum of Modern and Contemporary Art
Paintings in the collection of the Musée des Beaux-Arts de Strasbourg
Paintings by Dante Gabriel Rossetti
1863 paintings
Cultural depictions of Joan of Arc
Oil on canvas paintings